Wales is sometimes called the "castle capital of the world" because of the large number of castles in a relatively small area. Wales had about 600 castles, of which over 100 are still standing, either as ruins or as restored buildings. The rest have returned to nature, and today consist of ditches, mounds, and earthworks, often in commanding positions. Many of the sites in Wales are cared for by Cadw, the Welsh government's historic environment service.

The four castles of Beaumaris, Caernarfon, Conwy, and Harlech together make up the Castles and Town Walls of King Edward in Gwynedd World Heritage Site, considered to be the "finest examples of late 13th century and early 14th century military architecture in Europe".

Bridgend

Castles of which only earthworks, fragments, or nothing remains include:

Caerphilly

Cardiff
Castles of which only earthworks or nothing remains include:

Carmarthenshire

Castles of which only earthworks or nothing remains include:

Ceredigion

Castles of which only earthworks or nothing remains include:

Conwy

Denbighshire

Flintshire

Gwynedd

Isle of Anglesey

Merthyr Tydfil

Monmouthshire

Neath Port Talbot

Newport

Castle with only earthworks, Wentloog Castle.

Pembrokeshire

Powys

Castles of which only earthworks, fragments or nothing remains include:

Rhondda Cynon Taf
Castles of which only earthworks, fragments or nothing remains include:

Swansea

Vale of Glamorgan

Castles of which only earthworks, fragments or nothing remains include:

Wrexham

See also
List of castles
Castles in Great Britain and Ireland
Castles in England
Castles in Scotland
Castles in Northern Ireland
Castles in the Isle of Man

References

External links

Cadw , the Welsh Government's historic environment service Cadw
Coflein, the database of the Royal Commission on the Ancient and Historical Monuments of Wales

 01
Lists of buildings and structures in Wales
Wales
Welsh military-related lists
Gothic architecture in Wales
Military history of Wales
List of castles in Wales